Yaxhá Lake is a Guatemalan lake situated in the northern department of El Petén.

The ancient Maya City of Yaxhá was built on the shores of Yaxhá Lake, and the Maya ruins of Topoxté occupy a group of three small islands, Canté, Paxté and Topoxte, at the western end of the lake.

References

External links
 Natural Private Reserve Association of Guatemala (NPRA)

Yaxha
Geography of the Petén Department